Epicrates may refer to:
 Epicrates of Ambracia, an ancient Greek and Middle Comedy playwright
 Epicrates of Athens, an ancient Athenian involved in political affairs
 Epicrates (snake), a group of boas (snakes)